Awerial is a County in Lakes State, central South Sudan.

The County made headlines in December 2013 when it received over 70,000 internally displaced people fleeing fighting in nearby Bor .
The town is also the seat of an Anglican Bishopric.

Populated places in Lakes (state)
Counties of South Sudan
 

Awerial county is border Terekeka county of central equatoria state to the south,  Bor South of Jonglei state to east, yirol east county to the north,  yirol west county to the north west.